Harry Frederick Gurney (born 25 October 1986) is an English former cricketer who played international cricket for the England cricket team.  Gurney made his One Day International debut on 9 May 2014 against Scotland.  Domestically, he played for Nottinghamshire County Cricket Club after leaving Leicestershire County Cricket Club at the end of the 2011 season. He primarily played as a left-arm seamer.

Leicestershire
Gurney had relative success in Leicestershire's second team and made his first team debut in the 2007 season.

Gurney has also played for Loughborough Town CC and the Leeds/Bradford UCCE, for whom he took the wicket of ex-England Test Captain Michael Vaughan.

In 2009, Gurney shone in T20, taking 8 wickets at an average of 23. However, he struggled to make an impact in the longer form of the game, averaging over 50 in the second division of the County Championship. The following year, Gurney's Twenty20 form dipped, although he improved in the Championship, averaging just over 33.

In 2011, Gurney proved adept particularly in Twenty20 matches, taking 23 wickets during Leicestershire's title winning campaign, although he missed out on Finals Day due to injury. He was though, part of the Foxes squad in the 2011 Champions League Twenty20 which took place in India. He took 5 wickets in the tournament although Leicester lost both their games in the competition.

Nottinghamshire
In 2012, Gurney left Leicestershire to join Nottinghamshire, following the same path as Stuart Broad and James Taylor. Although he was seen as a one-day specialist, Gurney also featured in the County Championship Division One for the first time in his career. Notts failed to win a trophy but Gurney established himself as an integral part of the team, particularly in the shorter formats of the game.

In 2013, Gurney was Nottinghamshire's leading wicket taker. As well as taking a hat trick in the County Championship, Gurney performed well in the Yorkshire Bank 40 competition, which Nottinghamshire eventually went on to win. Comparisons were made with former Nottinghamshire bowler Ryan Sidebottom, as both are left armed and rely on getting the ball to swing.

International career

Following Gurney’s good form for Nottinghamshire, he was called up to the England side for the limited overs tour of the West Indies. He did not play, but retained his place in the squad for the ODI against Scotland. Gurney did not take a wicket on his debut in what proved to be a rain affected match. Gurney was selected to play in the T20 match against Sri Lanka, taking figures of 2–26, although England went on to lose the match. Gurney took figures of 2–20 on his ODI debut and kept his place in the team, taking 3–59 in the next match. Gurney starred as Sri Lanka were bowled out for 67 in the third match as England took a 2–1 lead in the series. In the fourth ODI Gurney took 4 wickets but England went on to lose the match. In the series decider, Gurney was wicket less and Sri Lanka went on to win the match and the series 3–2.

Gurney was selected in the limited overs squad against India, although he only appeared in the fourth match of the series, taking figures of 1–51. He played in the only T20 match between the sides, taking 1–29 to help England win the game.

Gurney was selected on the limited overs tour of Sri Lanka. He played in the first game, but took figures of 0–66. He kept his place for the next game but again finished without a wicket as England again lost. His last appearance came in the final match of the series, where he picked up his first wicket of the tour, finishing with figures of 1–60.

T20 franchise career
In November 2018, Gurney was signed by the Melbourne Renegades as a replacement for Usman Khan Shinwari. He was drafted by Quetta Gladiators for PSL 2019. He also played for Northern Warriors in 2018 T10 Cricket League. In December 2018, he was bought by the Kolkata Knight Riders in the player auction for the 2019 Indian Premier League. On 7 April 2019, he made his IPL debut against Rajasthan Royals. He registered bowling figures of 2/25 in 4 overs and was awarded the man of the match award.

In July 2019, Gurney was selected to play for the Dublin Chiefs in the inaugural edition of the Euro T20 Slam cricket tournament. However, the following month, the tournament was cancelled. In July 2020, he was named in the Barbados Tridents squad for the 2020 Caribbean Premier League.

In September 2020, Gurney underwent a shoulder surgery. As he result, he was ruled out of the 2020 Indian Premier League and 2020 t20 Blast. He was later replaced by Ali Khan in the Kolkata Knight Riders squad.

Gurney was released by the Kolkata Knight Riders ahead of the 2021 IPL auction.

Retirement 
Gurney  announced his retirement from cricket in May 2021 following his shoulder injury.

References

External links
 
 Official Leicestershire Website Harry Gurney Background/Profile

Leicestershire cricketers
1986 births
Living people
People educated at Loughborough Grammar School
England One Day International cricketers
England Twenty20 International cricketers
English cricketers
Nottinghamshire cricketers
Quetta Gladiators cricketers
Kolkata Knight Riders cricketers
Marylebone Cricket Club cricketers
North v South cricketers
Melbourne Renegades cricketers